Janbaaz Sindbad is an Indian adventurous fantasy television series, which premiered on 27 December 2015, and is broadcast on Zee TV. The show is based on Sinbad the Sailor folktale and is produced by Sagar Pictures and Ashvini Yardi, Meenakshi Sagar. It was a weekly series airing on every Sunday nights. The show ended abruptly without completing the story due to the low TRP ratings, the last episode was telecasted on 28 February 2016.

Cast
 Harsh Rajput as Sindbad
 Mallika Singh as Ameen
 Mamik Singh as Arslaan
 Isha Chawla  as Kaya
 Gaurav Vasudev as Koshike
 Mayur Verma as Pathan
 Aryan Vaid as Zafar
 Anirudh Dave as Zuhair / Zahid
 Tarun Malhotra
 Chetan Hansraj as Rawat
 Deepshikha Nagpal
 Mayur Verma as Pathan
 Aishwarya Sharma Bhatt as Ameen's Mother

References

External links
 Official website

2015 Indian television series debuts
2016 Indian television series endings
Hindi-language television shows
Television shows set in India
Indian fantasy television series
Indian children's television series
Zee TV original programming
Films based on Sinbad the Sailor